Evan Brown (born September 16, 1996) is an American football guard and center for the Seattle Seahawks of the National Football League (NFL). He played college football at SMU.

Professional career

New York Giants
Brown signed with the New York Giants as an undrafted free agent in 2018. He made the Giants final roster, but was inactive for every game his rookie season.

On August 31, 2019, Brown was waived by the Giants and was signed to the practice squad the next day. He was promoted to the active roster on November 9, 2019, but was waived two days later, before being re-signed to the practice squad.

Miami Dolphins
On December 4, 2019, Brown was signed by the Miami Dolphins off the Giants practice squad. He was released on March 18, 2020.

Cleveland Browns
On March 26, 2020, Brown was signed by the Cleveland Browns. He played in a total of five games with 17 special teams snaps played. Brown was waived on November 5, 2020. He was re-signed to the Browns' practice squad on November 7, 2020, and subsequently released once more on November 10, 2020.

Detroit Lions
On December 4, 2020, Brown was signed to the Detroit Lions' practice squad. He was elevated to the active roster on December 25 and January 2, 2021, for the team's weeks 16 and 17 games against the Tampa Bay Buccaneers and Minnesota Vikings, and reverted to the practice squad after each game. He signed a reserve/future contract on January 5, 2021.

Brown was named the Lions backup center in 2021 to Frank Ragnow. He was named the starting center in Week 5 following a season-ending injury to Ragnow, and started 12 games.

On March 14, 2022, Brown re-signed with the Lions. He started 12 games in the 2022 season, largely at right guard due to injuries to Halapoulivaati Vaitai.

Seattle Seahawks
On March 16, 2023 Evan Brown signed with the Seattle Seahawks.

References

External links
Detroit Lions bio
SMU Mustangs bio

1996 births
Living people
American football centers
American football offensive guards
Cleveland Browns players
Detroit Lions players
Miami Dolphins players
New York Giants players
People from Southlake, Texas
SMU Mustangs football players
Sportspeople from the Dallas–Fort Worth metroplex
Players of American football from Texas